Traumatic pneumorrhachis is a medical condition in which air has entered the spinal canal.

Traumatic pneumorrhachis is very rare phenomenon. Only eight cases with pneumorrhachis extending to more than one spinal region had been reported in the literature. Gordon had initially described the phenomenon of intraspinal air. The term pneumorrhachis was used for the first time by Newbold et al. The two subtypes of pneumorrhachis, which includes epidural or subarachnoid, are difficult to distinguish even with CT scanning. However, the presence of pneumocephalus goes more in favor of subarachnoid subtype. Goh and Yeo in their study have reported that the epidural pneumorrhachis is self-limited, whereas the more common subarachnoid pneumorrhachis type may be complicated by tension pneumocephalus and meningitis. Traumatic subarachnoid pneumorrhachis is almost always secondary to major trauma and is a marker of a severe injury. For example, air may migrate via the neural foramina behind the driving pressure of pneumothorax. The pathophysiology described for it states that the penetrated air, which had led to the formation of pneumocephalus might have been forced caudally due to the raised intracranial pressure as a consequence of severe brain injury and patient's horizontal position allowing the entrapped air to pass through the foramen magnum into the spinal canal. Due to its rareness, asymptomatic presentation and myriad etiologies, no guidelines for its treatment or care has been described. Pneumorrhachis typically resolves spontaneously but occasionally it can have serious complications. Patient with subarachnoid pneumorrhachis should be treated meticulously and a temporary lumbar drainage may be required if they have concomitant cerebro-spinal fluid leak.

References

Neurosurgery